Temptation Box is the second studio album by the Japanese band Scandal, released on August 11, 2010. The album was released in three editions. The album reached No. 3 on the Oricon chart on its first week and charted for 13 weeks with 60,301 copies sold.

Track listing

Personnel
HARUNA (Haruna Ono) - lead vocals, rhythm guitar
MAMI (Mami Sasazaki) - lead guitar, vocals
TOMOMI (Tomomi Ogawa) - bass, vocals
RINA (Rina Suzuki) - drums, vocals

References

2010 albums
Scandal (Japanese band) albums
Epic Records albums
Japanese-language albums